Portrait of Teresa Manzoni Stampa Borri is an 1849 oil on canvas painting by Francesco Hayez, now in the Pinacoteca di Brera in Milan, to which it was given in 1900 by Stefano Stampa, the subject's son by her first marriage. She had also commissioned Portrait of Alessandro Manzoni from Hayez, showing her second husband, also in the Brera.

References

1849 paintings
Borri
Paintings in the collection of the Pinacoteca di Brera
Borri